Viva Nicaragua is a television station on channel 13 in Nicaragua. The channel also airs a mix of domestic and international programs, mainly consisting of news, lifestyle and sports programming, along with imported programming consisting of films, children's programs and drama series.

History

The television station was awarded in 2011 in a contested battle over the closeness of the winners, Celeste, S.A., to the family of President Daniel Ortega Celeste was used as a figurehead by the government in order to achieve the license. The frequency was formerly used by a relayer of TN8, however a spokesman of the government said that the channel was owned by Venezuelan funds. Despite the mix of programming, Viva Nicaragua's profile was intended to be a news channel.

References

External links 
 

Television stations in Nicaragua
Television channels and stations established in 2011